This is a list of songs that have peaked at number one on the Club 40 since its launch in April 2002.

2000s

2010s

References

See also 
 Club 40

External links 
 Club 40 chart
 Yacast France official website
 Le Hit des clubs – Tous les N°1 des clubs de 1975 a nos jours

Club 40